The Burdizzo is the name brand of a company that makes a castration device which employs a large clamp designed to break the blood vessels leading into the testicles. Once the blood supply to the testicles is lost, testicular necrosis occurs, and the testicles shrink, soften, and eventually deteriorate completely. When the device is used, the operator crushes the spermatic cords one at a time, leaving a space in between in order to prevent an interruption of blood-flow to the scrotum.

Animals

The Burdizzo is used primarily on farm animals such as cattle and sheep. For example, pampered cattle, used for Kobe beef, are often castrated by this method because of the reduced risk of bleeding and infection.

Humans

Burdizzos have also been used by some human males as a means of self-castration; though it lessens the risk of infection as no skin is broken, it is considered unsafe for humans, as the Burdizzo was not originally designed for human use, and causes blunt force trauma to the spermatic cords, which are thickly wrapped in nerve fibres.

References

Castration
Theriogenology
Veterinary castration